Graphina ruiziana is a species of fungus belonging to the family Graphidaceae.

It has almost cosmopolitan distribution.

References

Graphidaceae